Artana may refer to several places:

 Artana, a town and municipality in Spain
 Artana, village in Georgia

or:
 Artana, a town and municipality in Kosovo

See also
 Artane (disambiguation)